"Eh, Cumpari!" is a novelty song. It was adapted from a traditional Italian song by Julius La Rosa and Archie Bleyer in 1953 and sung by La Rosa with Bleyer's orchestra as backing on a recording that year.

The song reached #1 on the Cash Box chart and #2 on the Billboard chart in 1953. As a result, the song was also featured in a performance by Dennis Day on The Jack Benny Program on CBS Radio.

In the mid-1970s The Gaylords recorded another popular version for an Alitalia Airlines commercial, in the middle of which a comical letter from someone in "the old country" culminating with a joke about Alitalia is read.

The song also appeared in the soundtrack to Francis Ford Coppola's film The Godfather Part III, sung by Talia Shire as Connie Corleone.

Washington D.C. radio shock jock "The Greaseman" regularly used the song as one of his "bits" during the 1980s.

The rock group Chicago referred to "Eh, Cumpari!" in some performances of the song "Saturday in the Park" with the line: 
...a man selling ice cream, singing Italian songs, Eh, Cumpari! si vo sunari, can you dig it? yes I can!

The song was also used and credited in the 2022 surfing short film 'Gravity' featuring John John Florence. 

The song is a cumulative song, in which each verse contains all of the previous verses as well. It is sung in Sicilian and is about the sounds of musical instruments.

A rough translation reads as follows:

Hey buddy, [music] is playing.
What is playing? The whistle.
And what does it sound like—the whistle?
[vocalized instrument sound] the whistle, [nonsense rhythm words]
etc.

u friscalettu = whistle [small flute]
u saxofona = saxophone
u mandulinu = mandolin
u viulinu = violin
la trumbetta = trumpet
la trombona = trombone

References

Songs about musical instruments
1953 songs
1953 singles
Cadence Records singles
Italian songs
Novelty songs
Cumulative songs